Verkhny Karabut is a rural locality (a selo) in Beloroyevskoye Rural Settlement, Podgorensky District, Voronezh Oblast, Russia. The population was 289 as of 2010. There are 6 streets.

Geography 
Verkhny Karabut is located 42 km northeast of Podgorensky (the district's administrative centre) by road. Babka is the nearest rural locality.

References 

Rural localities in Podgorensky District